Dynamic Secrets is a novel key management scheme for secure communications. It was proposed by Sheng Xiao, Weibo Gong, and Don Towsley. The first academic publication had been nominated for INFOCOM 2010 best paper award. Later a monograph was published by Springer to extend this scheme to a framework.

Dynamic secrets can be applied to all bi-directional communication systems and some single-directional communication systems to improve their communication security. There are three main benefits:

1. the encryption and authentication keys are rapidly and automatically updated for any pair of communication devices

2. the key update process binds to the communication process and incurs negligible computing and bandwidth cost

3. Use a cloned key in either authentication or encrypted communication is guaranteed to be detected. the detection has no false alarms and does not cost any computing / networking resources. (dynamic secrets automatically break the secure communication when the clone key and the legitimate key co-exist. however, in order to find out who is the attacker, it takes further actions and consumes computing power and network bandwidth.)

References

Access control
Key management